Dahliaphyllum is a genus of flowering plants in the family Apiaceae. Its sole species is Dahliaphyllum almedae, native to Southwestern Mexico.

The genus is named after Anders Dahl (1751–1789), a Swedish botanist and student of Carl Linnaeus.

References

Apioideae
Plants described in 1994
Monotypic Apioideae genera